can refer to a selection of Japanese railway lines:

 Utsunomiya Line, a commuter rail line operated by JR East
 Tōbu Utsunomiya Line, a commuter rail line operated by private operator Tobu Railway

See also 

 Utsunomiya Light Rail, a future light rail transit line operated by third-sector company Utsunomiya Light Rail Co., Ltd. scheduled to begin operation in August 2023